Tomb KV15, located in the Valley of the Kings in Egypt, was used for the burial of Pharaoh Seti II of the Nineteenth Dynasty. The tomb was dug into the base of a near-vertical cliff face at the head of a wadi running southwest from the main part of the Valley of the Kings. It runs along a northwest-to-southeast axis, comprising a short entry corridor followed by three corridor segments, which terminate in a well room that lacks a well, which was never dug. This then connects with a four-pillared hall and another stretch of corridor that was converted into a burial chamber.

The walls and ceiling of the chamber were covered with plaster and painted with Anubis jackals and two rows of deities, representing the followers of Ra and Osiris, which are placed over a lower row of mummy-like figures. The winged goddess Nut appears along the length of the ceiling and what may be a representation of the Ba of Ra is painted above her head. The paintings are conventional depictions drawn from the Egyptian Litany of Re, Amduat and the Book of Gates. Wall paintings in the well room are more unusual showing the king in shrines in a number of different manifestations; for instance on the back of a panther or on a papyrus skiff. The objects shown in the paintings are reflected in the finds made in the tomb of Tutankhamun.

Relatively little is known about the history of the tomb. Seti II was buried there, but he may have originally been buried with his wife Twosret in her tomb in KV14 and subsequently moved to the hastily finished KV15 tomb, perhaps by the later pharaoh Setnakhte, who took over KV14 for his own tomb. Seti's name appears to have been carved, erased and then re-carved. Amenmesse or possibly Siptah may have been responsible for the erasure, while Twosret may have had Seti's name restored. Seti's mummy was later moved to the mummy cache in tomb KV35; only the lid of his sarcophagus remains in KV15.

KV15 is known to have been opened in antiquity, as there are 59 examples of Greek and Latin graffiti on the walls. Richard Pococke investigated it as early as 1738, but it was not until the arrival of Howard Carter in 1903–04 that the tomb was properly cleared. After Carter began to excavate the nearby tomb of Tutankhamun (KV62) in 1922, KV15 was used by his assistants Alfred Lucas and Arthur Mace as a makeshift laboratory for the cleaning and restoration of KV62's artifacts before their transport to the Cairo Museum.

The tomb is open to tourists with improved flooring, handrails and lighting.

References

External links
Theban Mapping Project: KV15 includes description, images, and plans of the tomb.

Buildings and structures completed in the 12th century BC
Valley of the Kings
Seti II